The 2016 Bangladesh Football Premier League (also known as JB Bangladesh Premier League for sponsorship reasons) was the ninth season of the Bangladesh Premier League since establishment of the league in 2007. A total of 12 teams competed in the league. The league began on 24 July 2016.

Saif Global Sports are the right holder of BPL's ninth edition and they will accommodate the advertising, branding, TV transmission, radio, marketing rights of the Bangladesh Premier League 2016.

Sheikh Jamal Dhanmondi Club are the defending champions, having won their Bangladesh Premier League title the previous season.

BFF has agreed to provide a purse of Taka thirty lacs as appearance money to each of the 12 participant teams for their accommodation and transportation outside the capital.

A total of 24 matches out of 132 matches were to be played in Dhaka and rest of the matches played outside Dhaka.

Teams

Stadiums and locations
The matches will be held in the seven venues.

Personnel and sponsoring

Foreign players

League table

Result

Season statistics

Goalscorers

Own goals 
† Bold Club indicates winner of the match

Hat-tricks

References

Bangladesh Football Premier League seasons
Bangladesh
Bangladesh
1